Lorine Zineb Nora Talhaoui (born 16 October 1983), known professionally as Loreen, is a Swedish singer and songwriter. Representing Sweden, she won the Eurovision Song Contest 2012 with her entry "Euphoria", which topped the charts in numerous European countries.

Interested in becoming a musician, Loreen took part in the Idol 2004 television competition, finishing fourth. The following year she released her first single, "The Snake", with the band Rob'n'Raz and became a television presenter on TV400. While working as a segment producer and director for several Swedish reality TV shows, she entered Melodifestivalen 2011 with the song "My Heart Is Refusing Me", which became a top 10 hit in Sweden. She also had top 20 hits in Sweden with the singles "Crying Out Your Name" (2012) and her Melodifestivalen 2017 entry "Statements". 
In 2023, her winning Melodifestivalen entry "Tattoo" topped the Sverigetopplistan chart.

Early life
Loreen was born in Stockholm, Sweden, in 1983 to Moroccan Berber immigrant parents. She was raised in a liberal Muslim household. Early in her life, Loreen moved to Västerås. She grew up there, and calls Västerås her hometown. She spent most of her teenage years in Gryta, a residential area in Västerås.

Music career

2004–2010: Idol
Loreen became known to Swedish audiences after taking part in the Swedish Idol 2004, under the name Lorén Talhaoui. During the qualification round, she placed third with the public vote. She would have been eliminated, but received a wildcard from the judges, allowing her to compete in the program. She finished fourth overall, and was eliminated during the eighth week. After Idol, in 2005, she released a promotional single, "The Snake", with the group Rob'n'Raz. That same year, she also presented the TV show Lyssna, broadcast by the Swedish station TV400. She then took a hiatus from more visible roles, and worked as a segment producer and director for reality TV shows such as TV3's Värsta pojkvänsakademin, TV4's Matakuten and SVT's Frufritt.

2011–2013: Melodifestivalen, Eurovision Song Contest and Heal
Loreen returned to the public eye when she took part in Melodifestivalen 2011 with the song "My Heart Is Refusing Me", which she co-wrote with Moh Denebi and Björn Djupström. After placing fourth in the second semi-final in Gothenburg on 12 February 2011, she competed in the Second Chance round, but failed to qualify for the final after a sing-off with Sara Varga. The song was released on 11 March 2011 and became a hit on the Swedish Singles Chart, debuting and peaking at number 9. Following Loreen's success a year later, the song re-entered the chart, peaking at number 22 in May 2012.

In the first semi-final of Melodifestivalen 2012 on 4 February, Loreen advanced directly to the final round with her entry "Euphoria", written by Thomas G:son and Peter Boström. She won the national final on 10 March with a combined total of 268 points and represented Sweden in the Eurovision Song Contest 2012 in Baku, Azerbaijan. The song won the competition with a total of 372 points from 40 voting countries out of 42 (Italy was the exception, and Sweden could not vote for itself). According to online betting companies, she was the favourite to win the contest. On 3 June 2012, "Euphoria" charted at number three on the UK Official Singles Chart, the highest chart position for a non-UK Eurovision entry since Johnny Logan's "Hold Me Now" in 1987. The single sold 62,148 copies in its first week in the United Kingdom. "Euphoria" is also noted for having a consistent chart presence in the UK, remaining in the top 20 for weeks after the competition, which was rare for a Eurovision song. On 21 June 2012, Loreen made an appearance at the MTV World Stage in Gothenburg. The title of her debut album, Heal, was confirmed in late August 2012. Released on 24 October 2012, Heal debuted atop the Sverigetopplistan Albums Top 60. It was certified platinum in Sweden during its second week, denoting domestic shipments exceeding 40,000 units.
A remix version of "My Heart Is Refusing Me" was released on 8 October 2012 as the second European single from the album. On the same day, "Crying Out Your Name" was released as the fourth single in her native Sweden.

To promote the album, Loreen appeared as a musical guest on several European TV shows, including Polish talent show Must Be the Music on 21 October 2012,
the second season of the Romanian version of X Factor on 18 November 2012 and the final of the third series of Dutch talent show The Voice of Holland. Loreen premiered a new single included in the reissue of her debut album in the opening of the 2013 Eurovision Song Contest. The song is called "We Got the Power", and was produced by Patrik Berger and written by Ester Dean, who have previously worked with Icona Pop, Rihanna and Robyn.

2014–2015: Paperlight project and touring

In October 2013, Art on Ice announced that Loreen would be one of the artists performing on their 2014 tour, which had the concept of combining live music with performances from figure skaters. The tour took place in Finland, Sweden and Switzerland.

In January 2014, Swedish SVT resurrected their prize winning series Sápmi Sessions in which well known Swedish artists travel North to meet their talented counterparts within the Sami population, and embark on a new collaboration. They have never met before, but have three days to write and record a whole new song together. Loreen herself was the subject of the first episode, working with Iŋgá-Máret Gaup-Juuso and coming up with the song "Son" for her new album.

Loreen embarked on the Tour XIV in April 2014 and performed in several European countries. On 7 April, during a concert in Amsterdam, Loreen announced that "Jupiter Drive" and "Dumpster" had been chosen as the next singles for her next album, to be released in August 2014. That same month it was announced that Loreen had started planning her second studio album, working with producers such as Taped Rai, Ted Krotkiewski, Tobias Fröberg and Tim Denéve. In May 2014, Loreen announced her first concert residency: En Euforisk Jul. The show was performed at the Moriska Paviljongen in Malmö, Sweden from 26 November and concluded on 20 December and was a Christmas show. Loreen grossed more than US$372.000 (2.885.139,00 SEK) and En Euforisk Jul was the 16th biggest selling tour by a Swedish singer in Sweden in 2014. During her visit to Montenegro in July 2014 she announced her album was to be released probably in October 2014. She headlined the Celebration of Budva Tourist Organization and the National Day event at the Jaz Beach in Budva. During an interview with Prva.rs, she said: "The new album is coming out in October and after that there will be a lot of touring. It's very different from "Euphoria", it's a lot dirtier and more hip hop." In summer 2014, Loreen was nominated for three Rockbjörnen and five World Music Awards. Additionally, Loreen performed at the 11th Kristallen in Sweden, where she sang a cover of Rodríguez's "Sugar Man", as part of the ceremony's "In Memoriam" segment. On 20 September, Loreen performed at Eurasian Music Awards at the Central Stadium in Almaty, Kazakhstan. Loreen performed at Eurovision Gala Night at the Casino Luxembourg in Luxembourg and she confirmed that the single of her new album was coming soon in March 2015. On 27 February, it was announced that Loreen's new single "Paper Light (Higher)" was to be released on 5 March 2015 in Scandinavia and worldwide on 9 March.

On 22 November 2014, Loreen announced on Instagram that she would be debuting a new project, called Paperlight. She has been working in the studio with Kiesza. Loreen performed at the special concert show Eurovision Song Contest's Greatest Hits in London, produced by the BBC and the EBU, which commemorated the 60th anniversary of the Eurovision Song Contest. Loreen performed as interval act during the Second Chance round of Melodifestivalen 2015 on 7 March singing the lead single off of Paperlight, "Paper Light (Higher)". In May 2015, Loreen headlined the Vienna Life Ball, Europe's biggest charity event supporting people with HIV and AIDS, attending the event in a dress designed by Jean Paul Gaultier. From 21 November to 18 December 2015, Loreen jointed the Christmas tour Julgalan 2015 in Sweden along with Måns Zelmerlöw, Lena Philipsson, Miss Li, Ola Salo, Jill Johnson, Petter, Hasse Andersson, Darin and David Hellenius. In December 2015, she performed at Turn on the Lights night concert in Amsterdam.

On 11 August 2015, Loreen revealed a new single, titled "I'm in It with You" released on 14 August 2015, and received generally positive reviews from contemporary music critics. However, the official music video, inspired by the 1979 film Over the Edge, received generally negative reviews by fans and critics. On 17 December 2015, Loreen announced her next single "Under ytan" ("Under the Surface"), a cover of the original song by Uno Svenningsson. This was her first official Swedish-language release and was available in the Nordics on 18 December and worldwide the week after. "Under ytan" received critical acclaim but was met with poor commercial reception.

2016–2019: Melodifestivalen return, Nude and Ride
In 2016, Loreen returned to Eurovision stage when she performed at the "Eurovision The Party" event that took place at the Stockholm's Tele2 Arena on the night of the upcoming Eurovision final and was broadcast via online worldwide. During an interview in Bulgaria in 2016, Loreen stated that she and her team are working "heavily" in new music to be released later in 2016 or early 2017.

On 30 November 2016, it was revealed that Loreen would compete in Melodifestivalen 2017 with the song "Statements" for a chance to represent Sweden again at the Eurovision Song Contest 2017. On 25 February 2017, she qualified for the Andra Chansen round, but didn't qualify directly to the final from her Melodifestivalen semi-final and was put in the Andra Chansen round. After this, she lost her Andra Chansen duel against Anton Hagman and was subsequently eliminated from the competition. During interviews during Melodifestivalen, she confirmed that an EP would be released in Spring and another in Autumn. She was also signed to BMG Scandinavia under management purposes for her upcoming studio album.

On 14 July 2017, Loreen released a new single called "Body". She also revealed that "Body" was serving as lead single from her first EP Nude, which was released on 25 August 2017. On 11 August 2017, "Jungle" featuring Elliphant, was released as a second song from Nude. It was also announced that her sophomore album would be released on 17 November 2017 with the lead single on 22 September 2017, but the first single, "71 Charger" was delayed without reason and released a week later, on 29 September 2017. The second single, "Hate The Way I Love You" was released on 27 October 2017 to critical acclaim. It was also revealed that the album would be called Ride and was released on 24 November 2017, a week behind its intentional release date.

In October 2019, Loreen released a cover of Julia Jonas' "Walk With Me" by for Ellos.

2020–present: Så mycket bättre, acting debut, Melodifestivalen and Eurovision return 

In order to celebrate the Melodifestivalen Hall of Fame, on 29 February 2020, Loreen performed "Fiction Feels Good", a reimagined medley of her Melodifestivalen entries to that point: "Euphoria", "My Heart Is Refusing Me" and "Statements", on the Andra Chansen show. In June 2020, she made a cameo on David Dobkin's Eurovision Song Contest: The Story of Fire Saga, along with other Eurovision winners, which premiered on Netflix. On 30 April 2020, it was announced Loreen was joining the Swedish TV show Så mycket bättre to be aired in Autumn. Songs released from the show were under her new label Universal Music Group with whom she signed with in 2020. Later in the year, it was announced she would be part of the Netflix film JJ+E to be released 8 September 2021, portraying Maria, the main character's mother.

In March 2021, Loreen's released her first self-written Swedish single "Sötvattentårar". Translated as "Freshwater Tears", the song tells you that "there is something beautiful about crying and going through tough periods". In the summer of the same year, she embarked on a Swedish tour. 

On 29 March 2022, Loreen announced a partnership with Lexus Sweden for her new English single "Neon Lights" as part of the Lexus NX campaign. The song was released on 13 May.

On 30 November 2022, it was announced that Loreen would compete in Melodifestivalen for a fourth time with the song "Tattoo". She participated in the fourth heat of the competition on 25 February 2023. During her performance, an environmental activist invaded the stage, which resulted in Loreen restarting her performance a few minutes later.  She won the fourth heat of the competition, allowing her to progress to the final on 11 March 2023. The song was released on digital platforms that same evening. It debuted at number one in Sweden, becoming her second Swedish number one single. She later won the competition with 177 points, thus becoming the Swedish representative for the Eurovision Song Contest 2023 in Liverpool.

Political activism
During the Eurovision Song Contest 2012 in Baku, Azerbaijan, Loreen was the only entrant to meet local human rights activists. She later told reporters that "human rights are violated in Azerbaijan every day. One should not be silent about such things." An Azerbaijan government spokesman responded critically, saying the contest should not "be politicised" and requested that the EBU prevent such meetings. Swedish diplomats replied that the EBU, the Swedish broadcaster SVT and Loreen had not acted against the competition's rules.

In July 2012, Loreen performed at Slavianski Bazaar in Belarus, where Belarusian president Alexander Lukashenko was in attendance. During her visit to the country, she met with the wife of political prisoner Ales Bialiatski, Viasna representatives and independent journalists, and in a two-hour meeting expressed her support of political prisoners and signed the petition to ban the death penalty in the country. Loreen later stated she was fully aware of the risks coming with "speaking out," including the possibility of being stopped or arrested at the airport when trying to return home.

In August 2013, she was the ambassador of the Swedish Committee for Afghanistan and she visited Kabul, Afghanistan, and the village Yaskin Bala in Warsaj Valley with Carl Bildt, Minister for Foreign Affairs of Sweden. The year after, the construction of a new primary school was due to start in the village and the plan was that Loreen would come back and follow the work of the new school until it was finished. "It was a great experience to meet the people of Warsaj in Yaskin Bala, both men and women. I hope to come back soon and meet my friends again," says Loreen, "Education is the most important issue, when it comes to decrease poverty and to help people taking control over their own lives," says Loreen, "I am very impressed of what SCA is doing in Afghanistan. To me, this is the right way of development efforts. I am happy to be committed in that work." For her work, Loreen was announced new patron of the World's Children's Prize in New York City, USA, and received the Crystal Globe. On 30 October 2014, she won the World's Children's Prize's Crystal Globe for the second time and met with Nobel Peace Prize winner Malala Yousafzai and Queen Silvia of Sweden in a ceremony at the Gripsholm Castle in Mariefred, Sweden. She also supports the WCP—the world's largest educational programs for children about children's rights.

In March 2022, Loreen performed at Sverige samlas och hjälper, a live fundraising gala in support of Ukraine after the 2022 Russian invasion.

Discography

 Heal (2012)
 Ride (2017)

Tours and residencies 

Headlining tours
Tour XIV (2014)
Summer Tour (2021)

Concert residencies
En Euforisk Jul (2014)

Promotional tours
Promotional Tour (2012–2014)

Filmography
 Eurovision Song Contest: The Story of Fire Saga (2020)
 JJ+E (2021)
  (2022)

Awards and nominations

See also
Swedish pop music

References

External links

Loreen at Rate Your Music

1983 births
Living people
Berber musicians
Swedish people of Moroccan-Berber descent
Swedish pop singers
Melodifestivalen winners
Idol (Swedish TV series) participants
Eurovision Song Contest entrants of 2012
Swedish women record producers
Eurovision Song Contest entrants for Sweden
Singers from Stockholm
People from Västerås
Eurovision Song Contest winners
Universal Music Group artists
English-language singers from Sweden
Swedish LGBT singers
Bisexual women
Bisexual singers
LGBT record producers
21st-century Swedish women singers
Women record producers
MTV Europe Music Award winners
Melodifestivalen contestants of 2023
Eurovision Song Contest entrants of 2023
Melodifestivalen contestants of 2017
Melodifestivalen contestants of 2012
Melodifestivalen contestants of 2011